Gabura is a genus of lichen-forming fungi in the family Arctomiaceae. Although it was originally circumscribed in 1763 by French botanist Michel Adanson, the name was nomen rejiciendum–it was "suppressed" against the conserved name Collema, and for a long time considered a synonym of Arctomia. In 2014, Per Magnus Jørgensen proposed to use the name Gabura for what was then known as Collema fasciculare. The name was formally resurrected for use in 2020. Gabura has three species transferred from the genus Arctomia following molecular phylogenetic analysis.

Species
Gabura borbonica 
Gabura fascicularis 
Gabura insignis

References

Baeomycetales
Lecanoromycetes genera
Lichen genera
Taxa described in 1763
Taxa named by Michel Adanson